Live from the Eye of the Storm is the first DVD released by Ill Niño – and the first released through Roadrunner Records. The DVD consists of footage from a 2004 Pennsylvania show.

Track listing
 "Te Amo...I Hate You " – 4:38
 "What Comes Around" – 4:02
 "I Am Loco" – 3:38
 "Cleansing" – 4:05
 "This Time's For Real" – 3:43
 "Unframed" – 3:30
 "How Can I Live" – 3:49
 "Drum Solo" – 0:46
 "Unreal" – 3:41
 "Liar (and credits)" – 7:10

Personnel 

Cristian Machado: vocals
Jardel Martins Paisante: guitar
Ahrue Luster: guitar
Lazaro Pina: bass
Dave Chavarri: drums
Daniel Couto: percussion
Omar Clavijo: keyboards, programming, turntables

References

Ill Niño albums
2004 live albums
2004 video albums
Live video albums
Roadrunner Records video albums
Roadrunner Records live albums